General Gilles Andriamahazo (5 May 1919 – 13 September 1989) was a Malagasy general and political figure. Originally he was a Merina and served as the military president of Madagascar (Chairman of the National Military Leadership Committee) between 12 February and 15 June 1975.

Early life and military career 
Born in Fort Dauphin, Anosy Region on 13 May 1919, he followed a military career. During World War II Andriamahazo served in the French Army and participated in the French military campaign against Algerian nationalists in the 1950s. He retired as an army officer in 1976.

Government 
He was the successor of Richard Ratsimandrava after the latter's assassination. He served as head of state from 12 February to 15 June 1975, when he resigned in favour of Didier Ratsiraka. He is widely credited with having prevented an outbreak of civil war during the tension that followed Colonel Ratsimandrava's assassination. He died of a heart attack at the age of 70, on 14 September 1989.

References 

1919 births
1989 deaths
People from Anosy
Merina people
Presidents of Madagascar
Malagasy military personnel